Siri Wigger (born 9 April 2003) is a Swiss cross-country skier. She is two-time Youth Olympic champion (2020).

Wigger won Youth Olympic gold in Lausanne on 18 January 2020. Her result in the girls' cross final was 4:39.95, 0.77 better than Märta Rosenberg from Sweden who finished second.

She is the daughter of cross-country skier Jeremias Wigger.

References

External links 
 
 Profile at the 2020 Youth Olympic Games website

Swiss female cross-country skiers
2003 births
Living people
Cross-country skiers at the 2020 Winter Youth Olympics
Medalists at the 2020 Winter Youth Olympics
Youth Olympic gold medalists for Switzerland
21st-century Swiss women
Youth Olympic silver medalists for Switzerland